Miętus, also spelled Mientus, is a Polish surname. Notable people with this surname include:
 Andy Mientus (born 1986), American actor
 Grzegorz Miętus (born 1993), Polish ski jumper
 Krzysztof Miętus (born 1991), Polish ski jumper

Polish-language surnames